Conospermum leianthum is a shrub endemic to Western Australia.

It blooms between September and December producing white-cream flowers.

It is found on sand plains and sand dunes along the south coast in the Goldfields-Esperance region of Western Australia where it grows in sandy soils.

References

External links

Eudicots of Western Australia
leianthum
Endemic flora of Western Australia
Plants described in 1904